The 18th Bangladesh National Film Awards, presented by Ministry of Information, Bangladesh to felicitate the best of Bangladeshi Cinema released in the year 1993. The ceremony took place in Dhaka and awards were given by then President of Bangladesh. The National Film Awards are the only film awards given by the government itself. Every year, a national panel appointed by the government selects the winning entry, and the award ceremony is held in Dhaka. 1993 was the 18th ceremony of National Film Awards.

List of winners
This year artists received awards in 19 categories. Awards for Best Short Film and Best Actor in a Supporting Role were not given.

Merit Awards

Technical Awards

Special Awards
 Special Award - Nazir Ahmed (posthumous)

See also
Meril Prothom Alo Awards
Ifad Film Club Award
Babisas Award

References

External links

National Film Awards (Bangladesh) ceremonies
1993 film awards
1993 awards in Bangladesh
1993 in Dhaka